Saša Marković (Serbian Cyrillic: Саша Марковић; born 13 March 1991) is a Serbian footballer who played as a central midfielder for Olympiakos Nicosia.

Club career

Early career
Marković played for youth selections of Kopaonik and Partizan, before moving to OFK Beograd in 2007. He made his first team debut with the Romantics during the 2008–09 season. Marković played 49 league matches, scoring four goals during his stint at Karaburma.

By Serbian FA Sasa Markovic was pronounced as best young player of Serbian Super Liga for year 2011.

Partizan
On 15 June 2011, it was announced that Marković had signed a four-year contract with Partizan. He scored his first goal for the club in a league match against Borac Čačak on 29 April 2012. He also played all six matches of the 2012–13 UEFA Europa League group stage campaign and scored a skillful goal against Rubin Kazan, after which he celebrated by dancing to the rhythm of Gangnam Style. He scored an amazing goal in 2014-15 UEFA Europa League game against Beşiktaş at the Atatürk Olympic Stadium in Istanbul.

Córdoba
On 15 June 2015 Marković signed a two-year deal with Córdoba CF.

International career
On 7 September 2010, Marković scored on his debut for the Serbian national under-21 team in their UEFA European Championship qualifier against Cyprus U21. He scored his second goal in a friendly match against Bulgaria U21 on 25 March 2011.

Career statistics

Honours
Partizan
Serbian SuperLiga: 2011–12, 2012–13, 2014–15

References

External links

Srbijafudbal profile

1991 births
Living people
Serbian footballers
Association football midfielders
Serbian SuperLiga players
FK Partizan players
OFK Beograd players
Segunda División players
Córdoba CF players
Cypriot First Division players
Apollon Limassol FC players
Olympiakos Nicosia players
Serbia under-21 international footballers
Serbian expatriate footballers
Serbian expatriate sportspeople in Spain
Expatriate footballers in Spain
Expatriate footballers in Cyprus
Serbian expatriate sportspeople in Cyprus